Hugh Logan (10 May 1885 − 24 February 1919) was an English cricketer.  Logan was a right-handed batsman.  The son of Liberal Party politician John William Logan and Maud Logan, he was born at East Langton Grange, East Langton, Leicestershire, and was educated at Westminster School.

Logan made a single first-class appearance for Leicestershire against the Gentlemen of Philadelphia at Aylestone Road in 1903. The Gentlemen of Philadelphia won the toss and elected to bat, making 200 in their first-innings.  In response, Leicestershire made 164 runs in their first-innings, with Logan being dismissed for a single run by Percy Clark.  The Gentlemen of Philadelphia made 287 runs in their second-innings, leaving Leicestershire with a target of 325 for victory.  They fell short of their target, eventually being dismissed for 222, with Logan scoring 12 runs before he was dismissed by Bart King.

Logan served in World War I with the Leicestershire Yeomanry, holding the rank of lieutenant.  He died following the Armistice at Tournai, Hainaut, Belgium, on 24 February 1919. He was survived by his wife, Phyllis Logan.  His father served as President of Leicestershire County Cricket Club, while his brother-in-law, William Everard, also played first-class cricket for Leicestershire.

References

External links
Hugh Logan at ESPNcricinfo
Hugh Logan at CricketArchive

1885 births
1919 deaths
Military personnel from Leicestershire
People from Harborough District
Cricketers from Leicestershire
People educated at Westminster School, London
English cricketers
Leicestershire cricketers
British Army personnel of World War I
Leicestershire Yeomanry officers